The 22000 Class "InterCity Railcar" is a diesel multiple unit in service with Iarnród Éireann in Ireland.

They are the first IÉ DMUs built specifically for InterCity routes, although they can also work on some commuter routes. They are designed to operate at a maximum speed of

History
In 2005, the Irish Government announced the €34 billion Transport 21 proposal for significant improvements to transport infrastructure, with major emphasis on the railway network. As part of this, large-scale replacement of rolling stock was planned, then made up entirely of locomotive-hauled coaching stock, the most based on the British Rail Mark 2 and Mark 3. IÉ ordered 120 replacement vehicles: in a major departure, the new trains would be 3 and 6 car DMUs rather than locomotive-hauled carriages. This order was extended to 150 vehicles in 2005, to 183 vehicles in 2007 and to 234  vehicles in December 2008.

41 additional centre cars were ordered in 2019 for delivery from 2021. No new driving cars would be ordered but as many services operate with two units joined currently it would be possible to reconfigure and release more units.

All units are underwent an in-service interior overhaul between 2019 and 2022. This programme included replacing the original cloth seats with leather and adding USB power sockets at each seating bay, amongst other changes intended to reduce ongoing maintenance and cleaning costs.

Deliveries
Supplied by Mitsui of Japan for approximately €400 million, the fleet was built by a partnership between Rotem of South Korea and Tokyu Car Corporation of Japan, who supplied the bogies. The first sets were delivered in March 2007, while the final sets were delivered in April 2012.

In March 2007, a €79 million order was placed for a further 33 vehicles to be used primarily on the outer Dublin commuter network. This was added to with an additional 51 Commuter vehicles in December 2008. As of 2015, there are 63 sets: 28 3-car sets, 25 4-car sets and 10 5-car sets, in three different layouts.

Two of the 3-car sets, 22010 and 22011, were delivered in July 2007 with corrosion damage received in transit from South Korea. IÉ did not accept delivery and stored the sets until October 2008 when they were returned to Rotem for repair, with a revised delivery date of early 2009. It was later determined that it was uneconomic to repair them, so Rotem added two additional units to the last order at no additional cost to IÉ.

Operations

The 22000 class was primarily ordered for InterCity routes except the Dublin-Belfast services operated by Enterprise and the Dublin-Cork service, for which IÉ purchased 67 locomotive-hauled coaches in 2006, but they have also been used on off-peak Dublin-Cork services since November 2009. 22000 units have now replaced coaching stock on services from Dublin to Galway, Westport, Limerick, Waterford and Tralee, and 2800 Class and 29000 Class DMUs to Sligo and Rosslare Europort.

The expansion of the Dublin commuter belt led IÉ to need dedicated long distance Commuter trains, and so purchased additional units for use on services to destinations such as Portlaoise, Carlow, Athlone, Dundalk, Kildare, and Longford; as well as Mallow in the Cork commuter belt.

Plans by Enterprise to improve its services included the potential of purchasing DMUs to replace its locomotive-hauled coaching stock. Among the options under consideration was the purchase of further 22000 Class units.

NI Railways was offered a variant of the 22000 Class to meet its "New Trains Two" requirement, before ultimately choosing a design similar to its existing Class 3000 unit. The train was sometimes seen on the Dublin to Belfast railway line, on out-of-service transfer to Drogheda train service depot.

Unit types
As delivered, the first 30 units were of three cars, for use on InterCity routes, as were ten of the 15 6-car units. The remaining five 6-car sets and the 17 3-car sets ordered in 2008 were configured for long-distance Commuter services from Dublin. Combinations of two 3-car sets, three 3-car sets, two 4-car sets, a 3-car set + a 4-car set and two 5-car sets are possible. In case of emergency, they can operate in formations of up to 18 cars.

 A1 22131–40: Driving car, catering, wheelchair accessible WC, one wheelchair space, 36 1st class seats
 A2 22207–30,41–63: Driving car, standard WC, 66 seats
 A22 22201–06: A2 car with NIR TPWS/AWS & radio system
 A3 22307–63: Driving car, wheelchair accessible WC, two wheelchair spaces, bicycle storage, 54 seats
 A33 22301–06: A3 car with NIR signal & radio system & parcels/bike space
 B 22401–63, 631–45, 731–45: Intermediate car, standard WC, 72 seats
 B1 22531–45: B car with sanding system
 3-car sets: A2/A22 - B - A3/A33
 4-car sets: A1/A2 - B - B/B1 - A3
 5-car sets: A1/A22 - B - B1 - B - A3/A33

In 2013, IÉ announced plans to reform the 22000 class units from 3 and 6-car sets into 3 and 4-car units, to obtain better flexibility from them in regards to passenger numbers per train. However, it soon became apparent that replacing 6-car units with 4-car ones would lead to overcrowding, which caused IÉ to subsequently alter the proposal into sets of 3, 4 and 5-car lengths. The 20 cars taken off the original 6-car sets 22031–45 and inserted in the original 3-car sets 22011–30 got additional numbers 22811–30 but also kept the original number 22531–540,641,741,642,742,643,743,644,744,645,745.

Fuel economy
There have been attempts to improve the fuel economy of the 22000 Class. In 2008 the class were modified to shut down the engines after a period of inactivity if the drivers cab key was off, and in 2018 it was announced one three car unit was to trial a ZF transmission to replace the original Voith and it was hoped this might yield 19% fuel savings in some conditions.

An additional nine cars are to be fitted with a diesel-battery hybrid MTU/Rolls-Royce power pack as a trial, with route-dependent fuel savings of up to 33%

Future
In 2018, it was announced that Iarnród Éireann were seeking to procure a further 41 new 22000 Class vehicles, encompassing three additional units plus a number of intermediate trailers intended to lengthen some of the existing fleet. The ultimate aim is to return the fleet to a mix of three and six-car sets.

An order for 41 intermediate ("type B") cars, which would release additional units by reconfiguration of existing pairs, was confirmed in October 2019.

Fleet details

Features
 Engine: MTU 6H 1800 R83, 12.8 L, 6 cylinder, 483 bhp gross,  traction per car.
 Transmission: Voith T 312 R
 Top speed: 160 km/h (100 mph)
 Body: high quality stainless steel with some corrosion-resistant carbon steel components 
 Automatic PA and information display systems (Supplier: SA Viewcom)
 Fully air-conditioned (Supplier: Toshiba)
 Saloon, external view of doors and front-facing CCTV camera and recording system (Supplier: Verint)
 Catering facilities (some trains have buffet bars)
 Individual base seating
 Fire safety to BS 6853 Cat 1B, automatic fire extinguishing system for engines & fuel tanks
 All sets have Irish standard CAWS signaling systems and train radio.
 3-car sets 22001–22006, as well as 5-car sets 22036–22039 have TPWS/AWS for operation on Northern Ireland Railways.

Routes

InterCity services

Dublin Heuston / Athlone to Galway Ceannt
Dublin Heuston / Athlone to Westport
Dublin Heuston to Limerick Colbert
Dublin Heuston to Tralee Casement
Dublin Heuston to Waterford Plunkett
Waterford Plunkett to Limerick Junction
Limerick Colbert to Limerick Junction
Dublin Connolly to Sligo MacDiarmada
Dublin Connolly to Rosslare Europort
Mallow to Tralee Casement
Dublin Heuston to Cork Kent (off-peak)
Limerick Colbert to Galway Ceannt (occasionally)
Limerick Colbert to Ballybrophy (occasionally)
Dublin Connolly to Belfast Lanyon Place (occasionally)

Commuter services
Dublin Heuston to Newbridge / Portlaoise
Newbridge / Hazelhatch & Celbridge to Grand Canal Dock
Docklands / Clonsilla to M3 Parkway
Dublin Pearse to Drogheda MacBride / Dundalk Clarke (occasionally)
Dublin Pearse to Maynooth (occasionally)

Model railways 
Irish manufacturer Irish Railway Models announced a 22000 Class model in October 2022 as their first DMU and it is due for release in 2024.

See also
 Steam Locomotives of Ireland
 Diesel Locomotives of Ireland
 Multiple Units of Ireland

References

External links

 Irish Rail Fleet Information website

Iarnród Éireann multiple units
Multiple units of Ireland
Hyundai Rotem multiple units